The Shadow Secretary of State for Young People and Democracy was a position in the Shadow Cabinet of the United Kingdom.

The role was established as Shadow Minister for Young People and Voter Registration by the Leader of the Opposition, Jeremy Corbyn, on 14 September 2015. Upon Cat Smith's appointment in 2016, the title was changed to Shadow Minister for Voter Engagement and Youth Affairs. Opposition Leader Keir Starmer re-named the position in his May 2021 reshuffle to Shadow Secretary of State for Young People and Democracy. The position was abolished in the November 2021 reshuffle.

List of officeholders

List of Shadow Ministers for Young People and Voter Registration

List of Shadow Ministers for Voter Engagement and Youth Affairs

List of Shadow Secretaries of State for Young People and Democracy

See also
 Official Opposition frontbench

References

Official Opposition (United Kingdom)
Youth politics in the United Kingdom